Middle Branch Chillisquaque Creek is a tributary of Chillisquaque Creek in Columbia County and Montour County, in Pennsylvania, in the United States. Lake Chillisquaque is also in the creek. There are 122 features classified as "disturbances" on Middle Branch Chillisquaque Creek.

Course

Middle Branch Chillisquaque Creek begins in a valley in western Madison Township, Columbia County. It flows southwest through the valley into Anthony Township, Montour County, where it flows southwest for a few miles before leaving the valley and crossing Pennsylvania Route 44. The creek then turns south and flows through Lake Chillisquaque. South of the lake, the creek flows through a flat area for some distance. It then exits Anthony Township and enters Derry Township, Montour County. In Derry Township, the creek almost immediately meets East Branch Chillisquaque Creek to form Chillisquaque Creek.

Hydrology
Middle Branch Chillisquaque Creek is ranked 6th in priority on the 305B Stream Listings in the watershed of Chillisquaque Creek. It experiences siltation and has been subjected to hydromodifcation and flow alterations.

The concentration of alkalinity in Middle Branch Chillisquaque Creek ranges from under 10 to over 70 milligrams per liter. The concentrations of nitrates and phosphates are both high.

Geology and geography

There are 122 features classified as "disturbances" on Middle Branch Chillisquaque Creek. 96 of these (78.7 percent) are erosion sites, 45 of which are on the creek's right bank and 51 of which are on the creek's left bank. 14 of the "disturbances" are gravel bars, 7 are bridges, 3 are riprap, and 2 are pipes.

The streambed of Middle Branch Chillisquaque Creek is publicly owned.

Watershed

, or 89.6 percent, are classified as "not attaining".

Lake Chillisquaque is a reservoir located on Middle Branch Chillisquaque Creek and is the largest lake in Montour County. It has an area of 165 acres.

Middle Branch Chillisqauque Creek is the most significant tributary of Lake Chillisqauque.

History, recreation, and etymology
Lake Chillisquaque was created on Middle Branch Chillisquaque Creek in 1972. Its original purpose was as a supply of cooling water for a nearby power plant. Both bridges are made of concrete.

The Chillisquagi Trail in the Montour Preserve crosses Middle Branch Chillisquaque Creek.

The word chillisquaque in Middle Branch Chillisquaque Creek's name comes from either the Native American word chilisuagi, which refers to a place commonly visited by snowbirds (specifically, a "place frequented by snowbirds") or the Native American word for "frozen duck".

Biology
Lake Chillisquaque is stocked by the Pennsylvania Fish and Boat Commission. Middle Branch Chillisquaque Creek is designated as a warmwater fishery.

See also
List of rivers of Pennsylvania
West Branch Chillisquaque Creek

References

Rivers of Columbia County, Pennsylvania
Rivers of Montour County, Pennsylvania
Tributaries of Chillisquaque Creek
Rivers of Pennsylvania